Komsomolsk is a town and the administrative center of Komsomolsky District in Ivanovo Oblast, Russia, located on the Ukhtokhma River (Uvod's tributary)  west of Ivanovo, the administrative center of the oblast. Population:

History
It was founded in 1931 and granted town status in 1950.

Administrative and municipal status
Within the framework of administrative divisions, Komsomolsk serves as the administrative center of Komsomolsky District, to which it is directly subordinated. Prior to the adoption of the Law #145-OZ On the Administrative-Territorial Division of Ivanovo Oblast in December 2010, it used to be incorporated separately as an administrative unit with the status equal to that of the districts.

As a municipal division, the town of Komsomolsk is incorporated within Komsomolsky Municipal District as Komsomolskoye Urban Settlement.

References

Notes

Sources

Cities and towns in Ivanovo Oblast
Shuysky Uyezd
Cities and towns built in the Soviet Union
Populated places established in 1931
1931 establishments in the Soviet Union